Reithoffer Shows, Inc. is a North American, family-owned and operated traveling midway. They provide carnival and fair rides, games, and food to fairgrounds located mainly along the East Coast of the United States. Events featuring a Reithoffer Shows midway are held from April through November. The company's headquarters are located in Gibsonton, Florida, USA.

Rides and attractions 
Reithoffer Shows owns a wide range of rides and attractions.  Some examples are listed here.

Thrill rides 
 Tango
 Dutch Wheel
 Speed
 Zipper
 Tornado (a HUSS Flipper)
 Gentle Giant
 Racing (Roller Coaster)
 Indy Racer Coaster
 Stinger (New, Technical Park Loop Fighter)
 Starship 3000
 Ring of Fire
 Full Tilt
 The Beast

Family rides 
 Barnyard
 Mardi Gras
 Century Wheel
 Gravity Storm
 Tornado (manufactured by Wisdom)
 Wild Mouse
 Himalaya
 Super Himalaya
 Tilt a Whirl
 Wacky Worm
 Iron Dragon

Kiddie rides 
 Bear Affair
 Dizzy Dragons
 Bumble Bee
 Choo Choo Charlie Train
 Crazy Bus (Fire Chief)
 Demolition Derby
 Fun Slide
 Giant Wheel (Dutch Wheel)
 Classic Carousel

Popular Events
Reithoffer Shows hosts a wide array of events along the east coast.

A Few Notable Events
 National Peanut Festival - Dothan, Alabama
 Fonda Fair
 West Virginia State Fair
 Cleveland County Fair - Shelby, North Carolina
 Brockton Fair, Brockton Massachusetts

References

External links 
 Reithoffer Shows Web Site

Traveling carnivals